The European Cemetery is a state protected monument at Ambala district in Haryana.  The occupancy right and management of the Cemetery is with the British High Commission. There are 66 graves of martyrs of world War 1  The war graves comes under the protection of Common Wealth War Graves Commission ( CWGC). It is also known as military Cemetery, as there are  many graves and monuments erected in the memory of soldiers served in the Indian Army of the British era.The  graves  found here are in the European Architecture. After Independence, the Cemetery is taken care by Ambala Cemetery Committee  and the Honorary Secretary of the Committee is the Parish Priest of Holy Redeemer Church ( Catholic Church)  and maintain two lakh grave in the cemetery.

Legend 
During 1899-1902 AD, British sent hundreds of Boer prisoners to Sri Lanka, India and other colonies. Many of the prisoners were kept at Ambala Jail. Few of Boer Prisoners couldn't return to their country and died in Ambala, India. Twenty of them got buried in European Cemetery. The rest had an agreement to join hands with British to fight against Black. The graves of Boers has their name inscribed at European Cemetery.

European Cemetery is also the resting place the last East India Company officials served in India.

References 

Ambala